Susanne Standish-White (born 3 November 1956) is a Zimbabwean rower. She competed in the women's coxless pair event at the 1992 Summer Olympics.

References

External links
 

1956 births
Living people
Zimbabwean female rowers
Olympic rowers of Zimbabwe
Rowers at the 1992 Summer Olympics
Sportspeople from Harare